Benesat is a commune located in Sălaj County, Crișana, Romania. It is composed of three villages: Aluniș (Szamosszéplak), Benesat and Biușa (Bősháza).

Sights 
 Eastern Orthodox Church in Benesat, built in the 17th century (1700), historic monument
 Reformed Church in Benesat, built in the 20th century (1909)

References

Communes in Sălaj County
Localities in Crișana